Nassinia is a genus of moths in the family Geometridae. It was described by David Stephen Fletcher in 1979.

Some of the species are known to be partially diurnal, possibly as an adaptation for mate selection. Several such species are aposematic and their males are often active by day, but retain the bipectinate (comb-like on both sides) antennae of their strictly nocturnal relatives. Either sex may be found at light traps at night.

Their food plants seem to be poorly known.

References

Geometridae